Warhaus is the second self-titled studio album by Balthazar lead vocalist and Belgian singer-songwriter Maarten Devoldere. It was released on 3 November 2017 through PIAS Recordings.

On this album, songs are sang by Devoldere and Sylvie Kreusch - by that time also his girlfriend. The track nr 9 "Kreusch" was titled after her.

Track listing

Charts

References

2017 albums
PIAS Recordings albums